San Lucy Village (O'odham: Si:I Mekk) is a populated place situated in Maricopa County, Arizona, United States. It is located one mile north of Gila Bend. and has approximately 300 residents, almost all Tohono O'odham. San Lucy Village was previously located elsewhere but was moved due to the construction of the Painted Rock Dam.

References

Populated places in Maricopa County, Arizona
Tohono O'odham Nation